Jean-Françoìs de Dompierre de Jonquières or (27 November 1775  - 27 May 1820) was a Dutch-Danish merchant of French descent, landowner and amateur artist. He is remembered for his drawings and watercolours of landscapes from North Zealand.

Biography
Jean-Françoìs de Dompierre de Jonquières was born on 27 November 1775 in The Hague, the son of the counselor Paulinus Philippus Henricus de Dompierre de Joncquières (13 August 1744 – 12 May 1822) and Cecile de Coninck (4 November 1748 – 12 June 1819). Ancestors of his father had fled from France to Holland after the Revocation of the Edict of Nantes in 1685. He achieved a doctoral degree in law from the Leiden University. The family moved to Denmark during the Napoleonic Wars. His father purchased Folehavegård at Hørsholm in 1898.

Dompierre de Jonquières worked as a merchant. He died unmarried and without children in 1820.

Gallery

References

External links

1775 births
1820 deaths
Danish painters
19th-century Dutch painters
Dutch emigrants to Denmark
Artists from The Hague
Leiden University alumni